Four ships of the United States Navy have borne the name USS Maine, named for the 23rd state:
 , was a battleship whose 1898 sinking precipitated the Spanish–American War.
 , launched in 1901, was the lead ship of her class of battleships. She participated in the voyage of the Great White Fleet, and was decommissioned in 1920 to be sold for scrap in 1923.
 , launched in 1994, is an  nuclear ballistic missile submarine, in active service as of 2019.

See also 
 , a British steamship launched in 1905

United States Navy ship names